Pedro Antonio García Villa (born 26 January 1973 in Murcia) is a 5-a-side football player from Spain.  He has a disability: he is blind.  He played 5-a-side football at the 2004 Summer Paralympics.  His team finished third after they played Greece and, won 2–0.

References 

Living people
1973 births
5-a-side footballers at the 2004 Summer Paralympics
Region of Murcia
Paralympic bronze medalists for Spain
Medalists at the 2004 Summer Paralympics
Paralympic 5-a-side footballers of Spain
Paralympic medalists in football 5-a-side